Jonathan Lacourt (born 17 August 1986) is a French professional footballer who plays as a midfielder. He is a former French youth international.

Career
In 2009 Lacourt was a victim of a challenge from Senegalese midfielder Kader Mangane in a Ligue 1 match which led to a broken leg. The injury kept him out for over two years.

After a successful trial with SC Bastia in January 2012, Lacourt was not allowed to sign with the Corsican side due to financial sanctions. He then went on to play in Ligue 2 for LB Châteauroux, before joining Amiens SC.

Honours
Lens
UEFA Intertoto Cup: 2005

References

External links
 Profile and pictures of Jonathan Lacourt on Sitercl.com 
 

Living people
1986 births
Sportspeople from Avignon
Association football midfielders
French footballers
RC Lens players
ES Troyes AC players
Valenciennes FC players
LB Châteauroux players
Amiens SC players
US Albi players
Ligue 1 players
Ligue 2 players
Championnat National players
Championnat National 3 players